The All Saints Episcopal Church in Denver, Colorado, later known as Chapel of Our Merciful Saviour, is a historic church at 2222 W. 32nd Avenue. It was built in 1890 and was added to the National Register of Historic Places in 1978.

History 
The parish was organized in 1874.  The building was built as the All Saints Episcopal Church, and is the second oldest Episcopal Church building in Denver.

1999 Fiscal Year Restoration 
The Bishop and Diocese of Colorado applied for and received four state historical grants in the 1999 fiscal year (between July 1998-July 1999). The targets of these grants were to restore the pipe organ, stained-glass window protection, bringing the building up to current code, and improving neighboring lots. The total of these grants and matching funds was $200,000.

Significance 
It was deemed "significant both historically and architecturally. It stands today, virtually unaltered or changed since the day it was finished, as an excellent example of the small church designed to serve a parish of working class - lower middle class families. The building has added significance since it is the work of James Murdoch, an important architect in Denver in the late 19th and early 20th centuries."

Exterior 
The church was built in the Gothic Revival style and features a corner bell tower. The building was largely influenced by the German immigrants occupying the neighborhood at the time of its construction. Other notable exterior features are the rose stained glass window above the archway and the circular stone arches.

Interior 
Wooden statues, the pulpit, pews, and baptismal font are in their original form inside the chapel. The high beams of the ceiling are set in a herringbone pattern.

Present Day 
The church holds two services on Sundays, once in English and once in Spanish. The church has Rev. Cesar Hernandez Gutierrez, a director for the Colorado Episcopal Church Latino/Hispanic Ministries, on staff.

References

Episcopal church buildings in Colorado
Churches on the National Register of Historic Places in Colorado
Gothic Revival church buildings in Colorado
Churches completed in 1890
19th-century Episcopal church buildings
National Register of Historic Places in Denver
1874 establishments in Colorado Territory